Fontina (French: Fontine) is a cow's milk cheese, first produced in Italy. Over time, production of Fontina has spread worldwide, including to the United States, Denmark, Sweden, Canada, France and Argentina.

Description
Fontina is a cheese that is semisoft to hard in texture and mild to medium-sharp in flavor. It has a milk fat content around 45%. The characteristic flavor of Fontina is mild but distinctively nutty and savoury. Fontinas from Sweden, Denmark, and the United States have milder flavour, softer texture, and more holes than those of Italy. 

Fontina cheese has been made in the Aosta Valley, in the Alps since the 12th century. Fontina produced in the EU can be identified by a Consorzio (Consortium) stamp of the Matterhorn including the script "FONTINA".

As with many other varieties, the name "Fontina" has derivatives such as "Fontinella", "Fontal", and "Fontella". Although the version from the Aosta Valley is the  original and the most famous, a derivative production occurs in other parts of Italy, as well as in Denmark, Sweden, Quebec, France, Argentina, and the United States. The Swedish and Danish versions are often found in US grocery stores, and can be distinguished from Aostan Fontina by their red wax rind (also prevalent in Argentine Fontina). 

Fontina produced in the Aosta Valley must be made from unpasteurized milk from a single milking, with two batches being made per day.
The original Fontina cheese from the Aosta Valley is fairly pungent and has quite an intense flavor, although Fontina-like labeled cheeses that are produced in other countries can be much milder. Aostan Fontina has a natural rind due to aging, which is usually tan to orange-brown. The interior of the cheese is pale cream in color and riddled with holes known as "eyes". It is noted for its earthy, mushroomy, and woody taste, and pairs exceptionally well with roast meats and truffles. It has a rich and creamy flavor which gets nuttier with aging. Mature Fontina is a hard cheese, and melts well.

Protected designation of origin 
Fontina cheese sold in the EU can be identified by a Consorzio (Consortium) stamp of the Matterhorn including the script "FONTINA". Cheese produced in the Aosta Valley has a protected designation of origin (DOP) with regulations that the cheese must be made from unpasteurized milk from a single milking, of a Valdostana breed of cow, with two batches being made per day.

Recipes
Young Fontina has a softer texture and can be suitable for fondue. Fonduta alla valdostana (in Italian) or Fondue à la valdôtaine (in French) is a traditional dish of Fontina whipped with milk, eggs, and truffles.

A good pairing is Nebbiolo, a red wine with flavors of wild cherry and truffles.

Generic nature of Fontina 
In 1986, the U.S. Trademark Trial and Appeal Board ruled that "fontina" was the generic name of a type of cheese "rather than a certification mark indicating regional origin, in view of the fact that non-certified producers outside that region use the term to identify non-certified cheeses". Today, fontina is produced in countries around the world, including the United States, Denmark, Sweden, Quebec, France and Argentina.

See also
 List of cheeses

References

External links
 The Milk and Fontina Producers Co-Operative 

Italian cheeses
Cow's-milk cheeses
Italian products with protected designation of origin
Cuisine of Aosta Valley
Cheeses with designation of origin protected in the European Union
Washed-rind cheeses
Cheese with eyes